Miraflores is a town and municipality in the Colombian Department of Boyacá, part of the subregion of the Lengupá Province.

Miraflores has been the site of the ocobos (Tree)

External links

 Miraflores official website

References

Municipalities of Boyacá Department